Period (Another American Lie) is the debut studio album by B.A.L.L., released in 1987 by Shimmy Disc.

Track listing

Personnel 
Adapted from the Period (Another American Lie) liner notes.
B.A.L.L.
 Don Fleming – vocals, guitar
 Kramer – bass guitar, organ, production, engineering
 David Licht – drums
 Jay Spiegel – drums

Release history

References

External links 
 Period (Another American Lie) at Discogs (list of releases)

1987 debut albums
Albums produced by Kramer (musician)
B.A.L.L. albums
Shimmy Disc albums